The German software company Star Division (also written Star-Division) was founded in 1985 by the 16-year-old Marco Börries in Lüneburg as a garage company. After a neighbour denounced the operation of a business in a residential area to the Ordnungsamt, the company moved to Hamburg.

As its first product the company distributed StarWriter, a word processor application developed by friends.

Positioned as a cheaper alternative to Microsoft's office suite, StarWriter later became StarOffice, for which the company became famous. The software had sales of over 25 million worldwide, and at its peak it had a market share among other office suites of about 25% in Germany.

Caldera, Inc. supported the Linux port of StarOffice 3.1 with ca. 800.000 DM in order to offer the product with their forthcoming OpenLinux distribution in 1997.

In 1998 Börries released StarOffice free of charge for private use.

Star Division was acquired by the software and hardware vendor Sun Microsystems on 5 August 1999 for a higher double-digit million amount in US dollars. Sun reintroduced the software as StarOffice 5.1a, and for the first time also free of charge for commercial use.

The StarOffice suite has since been further  by Sun Microsystems and the OpenOffice and LibreOffice communities. 

Sun Microsystems became a wholly owned subsidiary of Oracle Corporation on 27 January 2010.

Notes

References

External links
 Star Division, Inc. (archived web site  from 1996-12-19 to 1998-04-22)
 Star Division GmbH (archived web site  from 1996-12-19 to 1998-02-13)

Companies established in 1985
Defunct software companies of Germany
Software companies disestablished in 1999
Software companies of Germany
1985 establishments in Germany